Tibiodrepanus is a genus of dung beetles comprising seven species distributed in Oriental and Palaearctic countries.

Species
 Tibiodrepanus hircus (Wiedemann, 1823)
 Tibiodrepanus kazirangensis (Biswas, 1980)
 Tibiodrepanus setosus (Wiedemann, 1823)
 Tibiodrepanus simplex (Kabakov, 2006)
 Tibiodrepanus sinicus (Harold, 1868)
 Tibiodrepanus sulcicollis (Castelnau, 1840)
 Tibiodrepanus tagliaferrii Barbero, Palestrini & Roggero, 2011

References

Scarabaeinae